Forest Hill Cemetery is a  cemetery at 415 Observatory Street in Ann Arbor, Michigan. It was designed by James Lewis Glenn and opened in 1857.

History
Prior to its use a cemetery, the site was the location of the nation's first fraternity building, a hunting lodge, built by the Chi Psi fraternity in 1849.

Civil engineer James Lewis Glenn designed the cemetery in the rural or garden style popular in the second half of the 19th century. The cemetery's main gate was designed by James Morwick in the Gothic Revival style. Gordon W. Lloyd, a leading architect based in Detroit, Michigan, designed the cemetery's gatehouse and sexton's residence, also in the Gothic Revival style.

In 1859 Dr. Benajah Ticknor was the first person to be buried in Forest Hill. Ticknor had been a surgeon in the U.S. Navy and the owner of property now known as Cobblestone Farm in Ann Arbor.

Notable persons interred at Forest Hill

John Allen, American pioneer and co-founder of Ann Arbor
James Burrill Angell, longest-serving president of the University of Michigan
Scott Asheton, musician
Albert Moore Barrett, American physician and professor of psychiatry at the University of Michigan
Clara Doty Bates, author
Samuel Willard Beakes, Mayor of Ann Arbor and U.S. Congressman
William Warner Bishop, librarian
William E. Brown, Jr.
Marion LeRoy Burton, President of the University of Michigan
William L. Clements
Charles Horton Cooley, sociologist
Thomas McIntyre Cooley, professor of law, justice of the Michigan Supreme Court, president of the Interstate Commerce Commission
Cecil O. Creal, Mayor of Ann Arbor
Lloyd Cassel Douglas, author
Pete Elliott, football coach
Elizabeth Farrand, author and librarian
Alpheus Felch, Michigan Governor and U.S. Senator
William A. Fletcher, first chief justice of the state of Michigan
Thomas Francis, medical pioneer
William Frankena, philosopher
Henry Simmons Frieze, president of the University of Michigan
Bradley F. Granger, U.S. Congressman
 Ted Heusel, Ann Arbor radio personality and Board of Education president
Daniel Hiscock, director at Ann Arbor Savings Bank
Harry Burns Hutchins, president of the University of Michigan
Eleonore Hutzel, nurse and social worker
Eva A. Jessye, composer and choir director
George Jewett, first African-American football player at both the University of Michigan and Northwestern University
Yale Kamisar, professor of Law, known as "father of Miranda" for his contribution to the creation of the Miranda warning
Oscar John Larson, U.S. Representative
Emmett Norman Leith, professor of electrical engineering
Rensis Likert, American statistician
Don Lund, baseball player
Rusty Magee, American composer and lyricist for theater, film, and television
Charles H. Manly, Michigan politician
Vincent Massey, Australian enzymologist and University of Michigan faculty
William S. Maynard, Mayor of Ann Arbor
George Meader (1907–1994), U.S. Representative from Michigan
Ann Mikolowski, artist, co-founder of The Alternative Press
Conrad Noll
Frederick George Novy, American bacteriologist, organic chemist, and instructor
John Nowland
Albert Benjamin Prescott, professor of chemistry and founder of the University of Michigan College of Pharmacy
Hereward Thimbleby Price, British writer
Eugene B. Power, founder of University Microfilms and regent of the University of Michigan
Elisha Walker Rumsey, co-founder of Ann Arbor
Henry Rumsey, American judge and politician
Israel Russell, American geologist and geographer 
Alexander Grant Ruthven, president of the University of Michigan
Bo Schembechler, head football coach and athletic director at the University of Michigan
Joseph Beal Steere, American ornithologist
William C. Stevens, Michigan politician
Louise Reed Stowell, scientist, microscopist, author, editor
Henry Franklin Thomas
Bob Ufer, University of Michigan track star, sports broadcaster
James Craig Watson, astronomer
Norval E. Welch, American Civil War Union Army Officer
Leslie White, anthropologist
Fielding H. Yost, head football coach and athletic director at the University of Michigan

References

External links
Forest Hill Cemetery web site

Cemeteries in Michigan
Protected areas of Washtenaw County, Michigan
Tourist attractions in Ann Arbor, Michigan
1857 establishments in Michigan